The Pyrodictiaceae are a family of disc-shaped anaerobic microorganisms belonging to the order Desulfurococcales, in the domain Archaea.  Members of this family are distinguished from the other family (Desulfurococcaceae) in the order Desulfurococcales by having an optimal growth temperature above 100 °C, rather than below 100 °C.

Phylogeny
The currently accepted taxonomy is based on the List of Prokaryotic names with Standing in Nomenclature (LPSN) and National Center for Biotechnology Information (NCBI).

References

Further reading

Scientific journals

Scientific books

Scientific databases

External links

Archaea taxonomic families
Thermoproteota